João Paulo Moreira dos Santos (born 15 August 1992 in Vale de Cambra) known as João Paulo, is a Portuguese footballer who plays for U.D. Oliveirense as a midfielder.

Football career
On 30 December 2012, João Paulo made his professional debut with Oliveirense in a 2012–13 Segunda Liga game against Leixões and played 12 minutes.

References

External links

1992 births
Living people
Portuguese footballers
Association football midfielders
Liga Portugal 2 players
U.D. Oliveirense players
Sportspeople from Aveiro District